Slovak television may refer to:
Television in Slovakia, lists of television channels in Slovakia
Slovenská televízia, a state-owned public television organization in Slovakia, 1991–2011

See also
List of Slovak television series
Radio and Television of Slovakia